The Wright Verdicts is an American drama television series created by Dick Wolf. The series stars Tom Conti, Margaret Colin and Aida Turturro. The series aired on CBS from March 31, 1995, to June 11, 1995.

Cast 
Tom Conti as Charles Wright
Margaret Colin as Sandy Hamor
Aida Turturro as Lydia

Episodes

References

External links
 

1990s American legal television series
1990s American drama television series
1995 American television series debuts
1995 American television series endings
English-language television shows
CBS original programming
Television series by Universal Television
Television shows set in New York City